Samuel Friedrich Nathaniel Ritter von Stein (November 3, 1818 – January 9, 1885) was a German entomologist. He was Professor at the Royal Saxon Academy of Forestry in Tharandt from 1850–55; and Professor, and later Rector, at the Charles University in Prague, from 1855–76. His scientific work focused on invertebrates, and mainly on Diptera.

Early life, education, and family 
Stein was born in Niemegk, near Potsdam, Brandenburg.

He completed his studies in 1841, conducting doctoral work at the University of Berlin.

On May 29, 1844, in Berlin, he married Emma Johanne Couard Ottilie (born December 30, 1823, in Berlin; died 2 September 1903, in Asch). The couple had nine children. The next to last, daughter Adelheid von Stein (born May 25, 1859), married Joseph Neuwirth.

Career 
Stein's scientific work focused on invertebrates, and mainly on Diptera, as well as single-celled animals. His work on infusoria became the basis for all subsequent research in this area.

Stein was appointed as Curator of the Zoological Museum at the University of Berlin, in 1849.

From 1850 to 1855, he was professor of zoology and botany at the Academy of Forestry in Tharandt, Saxony, 20 km south-west of Dresden. Tharandt had one of the leading forestry schools in Germany.

Formal education in forestry began about 1840 when private forestry schools were established. These were the outgrowth of the old master schools. The forestry college at Tharandt developed from Cotta Master School. Though not of the same order, Tharandt had close connections with the French National School of Forestry, which had been established in Nancy, France, in 1825.

The work at Tharandt, under Stein's supervision was of a very high order, thoroughly professional and of very high technical standards.

In 1855, he became professor at the Charles University in Prague, where he worked until retirement. He served as Rector of the university in the 1875–76 academic year.

Honors 
Stein was ennobled on April 27, 1878, in Vienna by Emperor Franz Josef I.

Works 
 , Berlin: Brandes et Klewert, 1841 
 , Berlin: Reimer, 1850 
 , Leipzig: Engelmann, 1854 
 , Leipzig: Wilhelm Engelmann 
 , 1859 
 , 1867 
  
, 1878 
 , 1883 
 , Vienna: Staatsdruckerei, 1863

References 

German entomologists
1818 births
1885 deaths
People from the Province of Brandenburg
Dipterists
Academic staff of Charles University
Forestry in Germany
History of forestry education
Academic staff of the Royal Saxon Academy of Forestry